Panucci may refer to:

Christian Panucci, Italian footballer
Penuche (Italian: Panucci), fudge-like candy